In computing, a solution stack or software stack is a set of software subsystems or components needed to create a complete platform such that no additional software is needed to support applications. Applications are said to "run on" or "run on top of" the resulting platform. 

For example, to develop a web application, the architect defines the stack as the target operating system, web server, database, and programming language. Another version of a software stack is operating system, middleware, database, and applications. Regularly, the components of a software stack are developed by different developers independently from one another.

Some components/subsystems of an overall system are chosen together often enough that the particular set is referred to by a name representing the whole, rather than by naming the parts. Typically, the name is an acronym representing the individual components.

The term "solution stack" has, historically, occasionally included hardware components as part of a final product, mixing both the hardware and software in layers of support.

A full-stack developer is expected to be able to work in all the layers of the stack. A full-stack web developer can be defined by some as a developer or engineer who works with both the front and back ends of a website or application. This means they can lead platform builds that involve databases, user-facing websites, and working with clients during the planning phase of projects.

Examples 
 BCHS
 OpenBSD (operating system)
 C (programming language)
 httpd (web server)
 SQLite (database)

 ELK
 Elasticsearch (search engine)
 Logstash (event and log management tool)
 Kibana (data visualization)

 Ganeti
 Xen or KVM (hypervisor)
 Linux with LVM (mass-storage device management)
 Distributed Replicated Block Device (storage replication)
 Ganeti (virtual machine cluster management tool)
 Ganeti Web Manager (web interface)

 GLASS
 GemStone (database and application server)
 Linux (operating system)
 Apache (web server)
 Smalltalk (programming language)
 Seaside (web framework) 

 GRANDstack
 GraphQL (data query and manipulation language)
 React (web application presentation)
 Apollo (Data Graph Platform)
 Neo4j (database management systems)

 Jamstack
 JavaScript (programming language)
 APIs (Application programming interfaces)
 Markup (content)

 LAMP
 Linux (operating system)
 Apache (web server)
 MySQL or MariaDB (database management systems)
 Perl, PHP, or Python (scripting languages)

 LAPP
 Linux (operating system)
 Apache (web server)
 PostgreSQL (database management systems)
 Perl, PHP, or Python (scripting languages)

 LEAP
 Linux (operating system)
 Eucalyptus (free and open-source alternative to the Amazon Elastic Compute Cloud)
 AppScale (cloud computing-framework and free and open-source alternative to Google App Engine)
 Python (programming language)

 LEMP/LNMP
 Linux (operating system)
 Nginx (web server)
 MySQL or MariaDB (database management systems)
 Perl, PHP, or Python (scripting languages)

 LLMP
 Linux (operating system)
 Lighttpd (web server)
 MySQL or MariaDB (database management systems)
 Perl, PHP, or Python (scripting languages)

 LYME and LYCE
 Linux (operating system)
 Yaws (web server, written in Erlang)
 Mnesia or CouchDB (database, written in Erlang)
 Erlang (functional programming language)

 MAMP
 Mac OS X (operating system)
 Apache (web server)
 MySQL or MariaDB (database)
 PHP, Perl, or Python (programming languages)

 MARQS
 Apache Mesos (node startup/shutdown)
 Akka (toolkit) (actor implementation)
 Riak (data store)
 Apache Kafka (messaging)
 Apache Spark (big data and MapReduce)

MEAN
 MongoDB (database)
 Express.js (application controller layer)
 AngularJS/Angular (web application presentation)
 Node.js (JavaScript runtime)

 MERN
 MongoDB (database)
 Express.js (application controller layer)
 React.js (web application presentation)
 Node.js (JavaScript runtime)

 MEVN
 MongoDB (database)
 Express.js (application controller layer)
 Vue.js (web application presentation)
 Node.js (JavaScript runtime)

 MLVN
 MongoDB (database)
 Linux (operating system)
 Varnish (software) (frontend cache)
 Node.js (JavaScript runtime)

 NMP
 Nginx (web server)
 MySQL or MariaDB (database)
 PHP (programming language)

 OpenACS
 Linux or Windows (operating system)
 NaviServer (web server)
 OpenACS (web application framework)
 PostgreSQL or Oracle Database (database)
 Tcl (scripting language)

 PERN
 PostgreSQL (database)
 Express.js (application controller layer)
 React (JavaScript library) (web application presentation)
 Node.js (JavaScript runtime)

 PLONK
 Prometheus (metrics and time-series)
 Linkerd (service mesh)
 OpenFaaS (management and auto-scaling of compute)
 NATS (asynchronous message bus/queue)
 Kubernetes (declarative, extensible, scale-out, self-healing clustering)

 SMACK
 Apache Spark (big data and MapReduce)
 Apache Mesos (node startup/shutdown)
 Akka (toolkit) (actor implementation)
 Apache Cassandra (database)
 Apache Kafka (messaging)

 T-REx
 TerminusDB (scalable graph database)
 React (JavaScript web framework)
 Express.js (framework for Node.js)

 WAMP
 Windows (operating system)
 Apache (web server)
 MySQL or MariaDB (database)
 PHP, Perl, or Python (programming language)

 WIMP
 Windows (operating system)
 Internet Information Services (web server)
 MySQL or MariaDB (database)
 PHP, Perl, or Python (programming language)

 WINS
 Windows Server (operating system)
 Internet Information Services (web server)
 .NET (software framework)
  SQL Server (database)

 WISA
 Windows Server (operating system)
 Internet Information Services (web server)
  SQL Server (database)
 ASP.NET (web framework)

 WISAV/WIPAV
 Windows Server (operating system)
 Internet Information Services (web server)
 Microsoft SQL Server/PostgreSQL (database)
 ASP.NET (backend web framework)
 Vue.js (frontend web framework)

 XAMPP
 cross-platform (operating system)
 Apache (web server)
 MariaDB or MySQL (database)
 PHP (programming language)
 Perl (programming language)

 XRX
 XML database (database such as BaseX, eXist, MarkLogic Server)
 XQuery (Query language)
 REST (client interface)
 XForms (client)

See also
 Content management framework
 Content management system
 List of Apache–MySQL–PHP packages
 List of Nginx–MySQL–PHP packages
 Web framework

References

Software architecture
Web frameworks